In mathematics, a binary relation R on a set X is reflexive if it relates every element of X to itself. 

An example of a reflexive relation is the relation "is equal to" on the set of real numbers, since every real number is equal to itself.  A reflexive relation is said to have the reflexive property or is said to possess reflexivity.  Along with symmetry and transitivity, reflexivity is one of three properties defining equivalence relations.

Definitions 

Let  be a binary relation on a set  which by definition is just a subset of  
For any  the notation  means that  while "not " means that  

The relation  is called  if  for every  or equivalently, if  where  denotes the identity relation on  

Related definitions 

There are several definitions related to the reflexive property. 
The relation  is called:

An asymmetric relation is necessarily irreflexive. A transitive and irreflexive relation is necessarily asymmetric. 

 If whenever  are such that  then necessarily 

 If whenever  are such that  then necessarily 

 If every element that is part of some relation is related to itself. Explicitly, this means that whenever  are such that  then necessarily    Equivalently, a binary relation is quasi-reflexive if and only if it is both left quasi-reflexive and right quasi-reflexive. A relation  is quasi-reflexive if and only if its symmetric closure  is left (or right) quasi-reflexive.

Antisymmetric If whenever  are such that  then necessarily  

 If whenever  are such that  then necessarily  A relation  is coreflexive if and only if its symmetric closure is anti-symmetric.

A reflexive relation on a nonempty set  can neither be irreflexive, nor asymmetric ( is called  if  implies not ), nor antitransitive ( is  if  implies not ).

Examples 

Examples of reflexive relations include:
 "is equal to" (equality)
 "is a subset of" (set inclusion)
 "divides" (divisibility)
 "is greater than or equal to"
 "is less than or equal to"
Examples of irreflexive relations include:
 "is not equal to"
 "is coprime to" on the integers larger than 1
 "is a proper subset of"
 "is greater than"
 "is less than"

An example of an irreflexive relation, which means that it does not relate any element to itself, is the "greater than" relation on the real numbers. Not every relation which is not reflexive is irreflexive; it is possible to define relations where some elements are related to themselves but others are not (that is, neither all nor none are).

An example of a quasi-reflexive relation  is "has the same limit as" on the set of sequences of real numbers: not every sequence has a limit, and thus the relation is not reflexive, but if a sequence has the same limit as some sequence, then it has the same limit as itself. 
An example of a left quasi-reflexive relation is a left Euclidean relation, which is always left quasi-reflexive but not necessarily right quasi-reflexive, and thus not necessarily quasi-reflexive. 

An example of a coreflexive relation is the relation on integers in which each odd number is related to itself and there are no other relations. The equality relation is the only example of a both reflexive and coreflexive relation, and any coreflexive relation is a subset of the identity relation. The union of a coreflexive relation and a transitive relation on the same set is always transitive.

Number of reflexive relations 

The number of reflexive relations on an -element set is

Philosophical logic 

Authors in philosophical logic often use different terminology.
Reflexive relations in the mathematical sense are called totally reflexive in philosophical logic, and quasi-reflexive relations are called reflexive.

Notes

References 

 Levy, A. (1979) Basic Set Theory, Perspectives in Mathematical Logic, Springer-Verlag. Reprinted 2002, Dover. 
 Lidl, R. and Pilz, G. (1998). Applied abstract algebra, Undergraduate Texts in Mathematics, Springer-Verlag. 
 Quine, W. V. (1951). Mathematical Logic, Revised Edition. Reprinted 2003, Harvard University Press. 
 Gunther Schmidt, 2010. Relational Mathematics. Cambridge University Press, .

External links 

 

Binary relations